The Tokamak à configuration variable (TCV, literally "variable configuration tokamak") is a Swiss research fusion reactor of the École Polytechnique Fédérale de Lausanne (EPFL). As the largest experimental facility of the Swiss Plasma Center, the TCV Tokamak explores the physics of nuclear fusion by magnetic confinement. Its distinguishing feature over other tokamaks is that its torus section is three times higher than wide. This allows studying several shapes of plasmas, which is particularly relevant since the shape of the plasma has links to the performance of the reactor. This asset has earned its choice as one of the three national machines in Europe involved in the design of the international reactor ITER, as well as in the development of ITER's successor DEMO, a prototype of a commercial reactor. The TCV was set up in November 1992.

Characteristics 
 Plasma height: 1.40 metres
 Minor radius: 0.25 metre
 Major radius: 0.88 metre
 Plasma current: 1.2 megaamperes
 Plasma life span: 2 seconds maximum
 Toroidal magnetic field: 1.43 teslas
 Additional heating power: 4.5 megawatts

Main studies 
 Confinement studies
 confinement as a function of the shape of the plasma (triangular, square or elongated)
 Improvement of the confinement of the core
 Studies on vertically elongated plasmas 
 Studies with ECRH and ECCD (electron cyclotron resonance heating and electron cyclotron current drive)

By 2012 it had 16 poloidal plasma shaping coils and could achieve a variety of field configurations and plasma shapes.

History 
 1976: First proposal for an elongated tokamak by the "New Swiss Association"
 1985: Second proposal, with a more elongated tokamak
 1986: Acceptance of the TCV proposal (Tokamak à Configuration Variable)
 1992: First plasma discharge
 1997: World record of plasma elongation (see plasma shaping)
 by August 2015 it has had a 19-month shutdown/upgrade to install its first neutral beam injector.
 by 2016 it was upgraded/enhanced to run with a 'snowflake' divertor

References

External links 

 TCV official site
 TCV Technical data as of Oct 2012

Tokamaks
École Polytechnique Fédérale de Lausanne